Robert Harington, 3rd Baron Harington (1356-1406) of Gleaston Castle in the manor of Aldingham in Furness, Lancashire, was an English peer.

Origins
He was born at Gleaston Hall in the manor of Aldingham, and was baptised at Aldingham. He was the son and heir of John Harington, 2nd Baron Harington (1328-1363) by his wife, whose name is not known, possibly she was Joan de Birmingham, his step-sister.

Career

His father died in 1363 when Robert was a minor aged 7, and he became a ward of King Edward III, who granted the custody of his paternal lands to his daughter Isabella of England (1332–1382), wife of Enguerrand VII, Lord of Coucy, 1st Earl of Bedford (1340–1397). He exited wardship having attained his majority of 21 and in 1377 was knighted at the coronation of King Richard II (1377-1399). He rebuilt his ancestral seat as a castle, recorded for the first time  in 1389 as Gleaston Castle.

Marriages and children
He married twice:
Firstly in about 1376 to Alice de Greystoke, daughter of William de Greystoke, 2nd Baron Greystoke (1321-1359), of Greystoke, Cumbria, without children.
Secondly in about 1383 he married Isabel Loring (d.1400) a daughter and co-heiress of Sir Nele Loring (d.1386), KG one of the founding Knights of the Garter, and widow of Sir William Cogan (d.1382), of Huntspill, Somerset, feudal baron of Bampton in Devon. Isabel was a great heiress of lands in Somerset, Devon and Cornwall, including the manor of Porlock in Somerset, which became a seat of her son and heir:
John Harington, 4th Baron Harington (1384–1418)

Death
He died on 21 May 1406 at Aldingham.

Sources

References

Robert
1356 births
1406 deaths
Barons Harington